Heart of America may refer to:

 Heart of America (film), a 2002 Canadian-German drama film
 "Heart of America" (song), a charity single
 Heart of America (college rugby), a college rugby conference
 Heart of America (yacht), 12-metre class yacht
 Heart of America (album), an album by Ryan Upchurch
 Heart of America Council, a BSA council
 Kansas, the central most US state